NGC 154 is an elliptical galaxy in the Cetus constellation. The galaxy was discovered by Frederick William Herschel on November 27, 1785.

Notes

References

External links 
 SEDS

Astronomical objects discovered in 1785
MCG objects
002058
Cetus (constellation)
0154
Elliptical galaxies